East Oolitic is an unincorporated community in Shawswick Township, Lawrence County, Indiana.

History
East Oolitic was originally called Spien Kopj, in commemoration of the Battle of Spion Kop in the Second Boer War. East Ooltic was platted in 1900. Oolite is a type of limestone found in the area.

Geography
East Oolitic, Indiana is located at  / 38.89889°N 86.51194°W / 38.89889; -86.51194, in Lawrence County approximately two miles north of Bedford, and one half mile east of Oolitic.

References

Unincorporated communities in Lawrence County, Indiana
Unincorporated communities in Indiana